The Seolmacheon in South Korea is a tributary of the Imjin River, which it joins at Jeokseong. It was on Gloster Hill, between the two rivers, that the British Gloucestershire Regiment made their last stand against the Chinese in the Battle of the Imjin River, a major event in the Korean War, from 22–25 April 1951. At the Gloucester Valley Battle Monument  the British Embassy in Seoul organises a service every April in commemoration.

Gallery

See also
 Gloucester Valley Battle Monument
 Rivers of Asia
 Rivers of Korea
 Geography of South Korea

External links
Korean government agency article on the Seolmacheon - in Korean

Rivers of South Korea